Colotis evagore, the desert orange tip, small orange tip, or tiny orange tip, is a butterfly of the family Pieridae. It is found in the dry parts of tropical Africa, northern Africa, southern Spain and southwest Arabia.

The wingspan is 28–35 mm in males and 28–38 mm in females. The adults fly from February to August depending on the range.

The larvae feed on Maerua, Capparis and Cadaba species.

Subspecies
The following subspecies are recognized:
 C. e. evagore Klug, 1829 – small orange tip (Saudi Arabia, Yemen)
 C. e. nouna Lucas, 1849 (Spain, north-west Africa)
 C. e. antigone Boisduval, 1836 (Sub-Saharan Africa, including Senegal, Gambia, Guinea, Mali, Burkina Faso, Ghana, Togo, Benin, Nigeria, Niger, Kenya, Zambia, Namibia, Botswana, Zimbabwe, Mozambique, South Africa, Eswatini)
 C. e. niveus Butler, 1881 (Socotra)

References

evagore
Butterflies described in 1829
Taxa named by Johann Christoph Friedrich Klug